Condat-sur-Vienne (literally Condat on Vienne) is a commune in the Haute-Vienne department in the Nouvelle-Aquitaine region in western France.

Geography
The river Briance forms most of the commune's southern border, then flows into the Vienne, which forms all of its western border.

Population
Inhabitants are known as Condatois in French.

Twin towns
  Forstfeld, Alsace
  Cilavegna, Lombardy

See also
Communes of the Haute-Vienne department

References

Communes of Haute-Vienne